Frank William Milligan (19 March 1870 – 31 March 1900) was an English amateur  first-class cricketer, who played in two Tests in 1899. He died in the campaign to relieve Mafeking during the Second Boer War.

Born in Farnborough, Hampshire, England, Milligan was a talented all-rounder who bowled at a lively pace, fielded well and went for his strokes with the bat.  He excelled for the Gentlemen v Players at The Oval in 1897, scoring 47 in each innings, and snaring two wickets for three runs in the Players' second innings; while at Scarborough a year later he took seven second innings wickets for 61.  He played County Championship cricket for Yorkshire County Cricket Club, despite having been born outside the county boundaries, and achieved ten half centuries and 144 wickets in a total of 95 first-class games from 1894 to 1898–99. He played his two Test matches on Lord Hawke's tour of South Africa in 1898–99.

He stayed on in South Africa after the tour, and served under Colonel Plumer in the Second Boer War, holding the rank of lieutenant at the time of his death in action in Ramatlabama, South Africa, at the age of 30. A memorial window, as well as a memorial brass, were dedicated to him in St Mark's church, Low Moor (which is now a private house). There is a memorial sundial to him in the rose garden of Harold Park, Bradford, West Yorkshire.

References

External links
 
 

1870 births
1900 deaths
England Test cricketers
English cricketers
People from Farnborough, Hampshire
Yorkshire cricketers
Gentlemen cricketers
Marylebone Cricket Club cricketers
British military personnel killed in the Second Boer War
Lord Hawke's XI cricketers
North v South cricketers